Sven Reimann (born 17 May 1994) is a German footballer who plays for SV Babelsberg 03.

Career statistics

References

External links
 
 

1994 births
Living people
German footballers
Association football midfielders
3. Liga players
Regionalliga players
1. FC Magdeburg players
Footballers from Berlin